Vulcaniella gielisi is a moth of the family Cosmopterigidae. It is found in Spain.

The wingspan is 10–11 mm.

External links
 Microlepidoptera of Europe. Volume 5: Momphidae, Batrachedridae, Stathmopodidae, Agonoxenidae, Cosmopterigidae, Chrysopeleiidae
Fauna Europaea

Vulcaniella
Moths described in 2003